Peter Goddard may refer to:

 Peter Goddard (educationalist) (1931–2012), New Zealand educationalist and academic
 Peter Goddard (journalist) (born 1943), Canadian music journalist and critic with the Toronto Star
 Peter Goddard (motorcycle racer) (born 1964), Australian Grand Prix motorcycle road racer
 Peter Goddard (physicist) (born 1945), British mathematical physicist